Yada'il Dharih I (Sabaean: 𐩺𐩵𐩲𐩱𐩡 𐩹𐩧𐩢 ), son of Sumuhu'ali I was a Sabaean ruler (mukarrib).

Life
Yada'il Dharih is known to us from building inscriptions which record his construction of various monumental buildings. His most significant building project was the Temple of Awwam, outside the gates of the capital city, Marib. He also built the temple of Almaqah in the temple city of Sirwah, and the sanctuary walls of the temple at Al-Masajid, 27 km south of Marib. Some other inscriptions indicate his connection to a place or building named Murad. An inscription which mentions the construction of a tower in Sirwah may also refer to him. His son was Sumuhu'ali Yanuf III.

References

Bibliography
 .
 . 
 . 
 .
 . 

Date of birth unknown
Date of death unknown
Sabaeans
Mukaribs of Saba
5th century BC Yemeni People